The women's 100 metre butterfly event at the 2004 Olympic Games was contested at the Olympic Aquatic Centre of the Athens Olympic Sports Complex in Athens, Greece on August 14 and 15.

Australia's Petria Thomas, who finished fourth in Sydney, won her first individual gold medal in this event, outside the Olympic record time of 57.72 seconds. The silver medal was awarded to Poland's Otylia Jędrzejczak, who trailed behind Thomas by 0.12 of a second, in an outstanding time of 57.84. Defending Olympic champion and world record holder Inge de Bruijn of the Netherlands, on the other hand, took home the bronze at 57.99 seconds.

Records
Prior to this competition, the existing world and Olympic records were as follows.

Results

Heats

Semifinals

Semifinal 1

Semifinal 2

Final

References

External links
Official Olympic Report

W
Women's 100 metre butterfly
Summer Olympics 100 metre butterfly
Women's events at the 2004 Summer Olympics